A Petzl Stop is a descender used primarily in caving and formerly used for industrial rope access made by the French company Petzl.

Usage
The Stop is for use with single low stretch kernmantle ropes and is usually attached to the harness via a carabiner. The rope is then threaded through the cam and bobbin by undoing the safety clip and moving the swinging side plate to the side. The swinging side plate facilitates insertion and removal of the rope without the need to disconnect it from the harness, making it less likely to be dropped while inserting and removing the rope from the Stop while at height. As the Stop is a self-braking descender, an unintentional release of the  deadman's handle should stop the descent, due to the asymmetric lower cam crimping the rope. This functionality safeguards the user in the event of being knocked unconscious due to a rockfall or illness, though the fine control of rate of descent should be carried out by standard method of manually controlling friction with the hand on the rope below the descender.

A simpler version of the bobbin descender, without the stop handle, is also available.

Versions

Original Version 

 Rope compatibility: 9 to 12 mm low stretch kernmantle rope
 Replaceable aluminium bobbins (main bobbin with stainless insert)
 Carabiner slot that can accept normal carabiners and Petzl Freino braking carabiner
 Short non folding deadman's handle made from metal with red plastic cover

2019 Version 
The Stop was updated for sale in 2019 replacing the original version. Changes to the design including updates to the dead man's handle, the bobbins and the carabiner slot. This version also saw Petzl shift the intended use of the Stop to recreational only use. The 2019 version of the Stop is no longer certified for Industrial use and Petzl now sell products such as the Petzl Rig and Petzl I'D S for Industrial use instead.

 Rope compatibility: 8.5 to 11 mm low stretch kernmantle rope
 Fixed stainless steel bobbins
 Wider carabiner slot to allow Petzl Freino Z braking carabiner to be rotated through it to reduce the chances of being drop when clipping between a gear loop and harness abseil point
 Redesigned deadman's mans handle using a black plastic folding handle longer than the original non folding one and providing leverage

Standards

Original Version 
 EN 341 class A 
 CE 0197

2019 Version 

 CE EN 15151-1, UKCA

References

Caving equipment